The East Shelbyville District, in Shelbyville, Kentucky, is a  historic district which is roughly E. 3rd St. from Washington to Bradshaw St.  It was listed on the National Register of Historic Places in 1985. The listing included 37 contributing buildings.

It includes mostly one- and two-story brick Federal-style buildings on lots from the original town plat of 1794.  The oldest are five three-bay hall-parlor plan ones on East Main St. built between 1800 and 1825, built of brick laid in Flemish bond.

The district includes the Gothic Revival St. James Episcopal Church at the corner of Third and Main, built in 1868.

The district was identified and listed as part of a larger study of historic resources in Shelbyville.

References

Historic districts on the National Register of Historic Places in Kentucky
National Register of Historic Places in Shelby County, Kentucky
Federal architecture in Kentucky
Victorian architecture in Kentucky
Buildings and structures completed in 1867
Buildings and structures in Shelbyville, Kentucky